The church of St James-the-Less is in Uttoxeter Road, Longton, Staffordshire, Stoke-on-Trent, England.

History
St James-the-Less is a Commissioners' church which was built in 1833-4. It cost £10,000. With a capacity of 2000, it was intended to provide for the rapidly growing population of Longton. Other Commissioners' churches were built in the Staffordshire Potteries around the same time, for example, St Mark's, Shelton, which is slightly larger. 
Not long after the completion of St James', one writer suggested that its size was perhaps optimistic given the strength of Nonconformist denominations in the area. However, it is still an active parish church.

Architecture
It is one of several Commissioners' churches designed by James Trubshaw.
The church was built from Hollington sandstone with a west tower, six-bay nave and clerestory, and a short chancel with polygonal apse.

Conservation
The church is a Grade II listed building. It is one of a number of buildings in Stoke-on-Trent which were listed in the 1990s after a survey of the city. Another example is the church of the Holy Evangelists in Normacot.

References

Church of England church buildings in Staffordshire
Commissioners' church buildings
Gothic Revival architecture in Staffordshire
Grade II listed churches in Staffordshire